Low-density lipoprotein receptor-related protein 1B is a protein that in humans is encoded by the LRP1B gene.

Function 

LRP1B belongs to the LDL receptor gene family. These receptors play a wide variety of roles in normal cell function and development due to their interactions with multiple ligands.

References

Further reading